Henricus umbrabasana is a species of moth of the family Tortricidae. It is found in the United States, where it has been recorded from California and south-western Washington. It possibly also occurs in Oregon.

The length of the forewings is 7.5–9 mm. The forewings are yellowish white with a well-defined brown to dark-brown basal patch and a black spot in the median fascia. Adults are on wing from May to September in one generation per year.

The larvae feed on the young leaves and shoots of Quercus agrifolia, Quercus chrysolepis and Quercus lobata. They feed from within a shelter covered in frass and debris. Full-grown larvae are dark maroon with a brown or black head. Pupation takes place within a cocoon which is also covered in frass and debris.

References

Moths described in 1908
Henricus (moth)